This is a list of songs that reached number one in Mexico according to Billboard magazine (with data provided by Audiomusica), and the Notitas Musicales magazine (with data provided by Núcleo Radio Mil, which would later provide data for Billboard as well).

For unknown reasons (presumably Audiomusica's closure), the Billboard magazine did not feature any Mexican charts after the week of March 30, 1968, and only began to publish them again in March 1969 (by this time, they were using Núcleo Radio Mil as their source as well). For continuity reasons, the Notitas Musicales #1s are also included in this article.

Audiomusica

Chart history

By country of origin
Number-one artists:

Number-one compositions (it denotes the country of origin of the song's composer[s]; in case the song is a cover of another one, the name of the original composition is provided in parentheses):

Núcleo Radio Mil

Chart history

See also
1968 in music

References

Sources
Print editions of the Billboard magazine from January 13 to March 30, 1968.
Print editions of the Notitas Musicales magazine.

1968 in Mexico
1968 record charts
Lists of number-one songs in Mexico